The 2013 Butler Bulldogs football team represented Butler University in the 2013 NCAA Division I FCS football season. They were led by eighth-year head coach Jeff Voris and played their home games at the Butler Bowl. They were a member of the Pioneer Football League, a conference allowed to compete in the FCS playoffs for the first time in 2013. They finished the season 9–4, 7–1 in PFL play to share the league title with Marist. Butler and Marist did not play each other in the regular season, so the PFL used the College Sporting News' Gridiron Power Index to determine who would receive the league's automatic bid to the FCS Playoffs. Butler was selected and lost in the first round to Tennessee State.

Schedule

Source: Schedule

References

Butler
Butler Bulldogs football seasons
Pioneer Football League champion seasons
Butler
Butler Bulldogs football